The 2008 FIRA Women's European Championship was the 11th rugby union women's European championship organised by FIRA - AER.

It took place in the Netherlands from 17 to 24 May 2008; for the first time since 2004 both the A and B championships were held simultaneously in the same host country.

Eight national teams took part to the Pool A: the four Home Nations plus France, Spain and the Netherlands; as for Italy they withdrew and were replaced by Sweden. Amongst the contestants in the Pool B were also the "France Défense XV", the French Army women's rugby union squad.

Results 
England won the Pool A title against Wales in the final. There were no tries in the match, which effectively amounted to a kicking duel, with each team dominating one half. Non Evans scored two penalties for the Welsh in the first half and Katy McLean scored four for England in the second half. The English took the title with a final score of 12 to 6. Both teams produced good play during the tournament; however, in this particular match the defence stole the lead over the attack and the precision and discipline of the English won the day. The new Champions of Europe succeeded France, who only managed to attain fourth place - despite the final score, 22-22, in the play-off against Ireland the last place on the podium went to their opponents as they scored more tries. A surprise placing for the Scottish who came in fifth, winning 27 -25 against Spain in an incredible match (8 tries), probably one of the best of the Championship with Spain just losing out in injury time. In the match for seventh place, the Netherlands beat Sweden 7 to 6.

It was an easy win for Russia in the Group B final against the French Military team. Faster and more organized, the Russian players took control of the match very early on when their full-back and team captain, Anastasiya Mukharyamova launched a counterattack from the 22 metre line and a few passes later, Anna Gottseva finished between the posts. Throughout the tournament Russia produced some splendid clean, creative and collective play. The speed and agility of their backs meant that they emerged as the team with the best attacking play. Their players took major risks and didn’t hesitate in launching counterattacks from anywhere on the pitch. It was no surprise when they won this afternoon in Amsterdam. Congratulations also to the Russian full-back Natalia Selyvtina, a very impressive “sidestepper”, who succeeded in scoring eleven tries during her team's five games. An incredible turnabout took place in the match for third place. Ten minutes from the end of the match, the Belgians were leading 15 to 7 and were expecting victory. However, they hadn’t counted on the courage of the Germans who scored two late tries, taking the lead in the last minute and eventually winning the match 19 to 15. In the match for fifth place, Romanian won 12 – 5 against Finland.

FIRA-AER officials also selected the best players of the Championship. The jury, made up of Technical Directors and Match Commissioners selected:
Group A, Barbara Pla, Spanish Back Row
Group B, Anastasiya Mukharyamova, Russian full-back and also team Captain.

The Fair-play prize was awarded to Russia

Pool A

Bracket

Quarter-finals

Semi-finals

Cup

Plate

7th/8th place

5th/6th place

3rd/4th place

Final

Pool B

Round 1

Group A: Final table

Group A: Results

Group B: Final table

Group B: Results

Round 2

Group A: Final table

Group A: Results

Group B: Final table

Group B: Results

Finals

5th/6th

3rd/4th

Final

See also
Women's international rugby union

References

External links
FIRA 2008 (Netherlands RFU)

2008
2008 rugby union tournaments for national teams
International rugby union competitions hosted by the Netherlands
2008 in Dutch sport
2007–08 in European women's rugby union